Samsan-myeon, also called Samsan Township, or Samsan for short, is a myeon (township) in Yeosu, a city in South Jeolla Province, South Korea. The population was recorded to be 2643 people, 1438 males and 1205 females, and the number of houses totaled 1261. The myeon office is located in 28-10, Geomun-gil in Geomun-ri. There are Jeju Province in the south-west of the myeon; mainland of Yeosu in the north-east; Goheung County in the north; and Wando County in the north-east. There is Geomundo/Baekdo zone of Dadohaehaesang National Park in Geomundo and Baekdo. The name of the myeon, Samsan, which means three mountains, is from three main islands in Geomumdo which looked like three mountains: Seodo, Dongdo, and Godo.

History 

It was subordinated in Heungyang-hyeon (currently, Goheung-gun) and was called Samdo in 1396. Samsan-myeon was established in 1908. It was subordinate in Yeosu-gun in 1914. It was subordinate in Yeocheon-gun in 1949. Chodo and Sonjuk branch office were established in May 1965. It was subordinated in Yeosu-si on 1 April 1998, because Yeocheon-gun was merged to Yeosu-si with Yeocheon-si.

Ri 

Samsan-myeon has six jurisdictions and ten administrative districts.

Geomun-ri 

Geomun-ri has one administrative district: Geomun-ri. It controls Godo of Geomundo, and Baekdo. It has myeon office.

Deokchon-ri 

Deokchon-ri has one administrative district: Deokchon-ri. It controls southern part of Seodo of Geomundo.

Dongdo-ri 

Dongdo-ri has two administrative districts: Yuchon, and Jukchon. It controls Dongdo of Geomundo, and Sambudo.

Seodo-ri 

Seodo-ri has two administrative districts: Seodo, and Byeonchon. It controls northern part of Seodo of Geomundo.

Sonjuk-ri 

Sonjuk-ri has one administrative district: Sonjuk-ri. It controls Sonjukdo, Sogeomundo, Pyeongdo, and Gwangdo

Chodo-ri 

Chodo-ri has three administrative districts: Daedong, Uiseong, and Jinmak. It controls Chodo.

References

External links 
 Samsan-myeon office 

Yeosu
Towns and townships in South Jeolla Province